Marden may refer to:

Places

Australia
 Marden, South Australia, a suburb of Adelaide

England
 Marden, Herefordshire
 Marden, Kent
 Marden Airfield
 Marden railway station
 Marden, Tyne and Wear
 Marden, West Sussex
 East Marden
 North Marden
 Marden, Wiltshire
 Marden Henge
 Up Marden, Compton, West Sussex
 Marden Park, Surrey

Other uses
 Marden (surname)
 Marden's theorem, in complex geometry
 River Marden, Wiltshire, England

See also
 Marsden (disambiguation)
 Madsen (disambiguation)